The Port Colborne explosion at Port Colborne, Ontario was a dust explosion in the Dominion grain elevator on August 9, 1919. The blast killed 10 and seriously injured 16 more.

Background
A dust explosion is the rapid combustion of fine particles suspended in the air within an enclosed location. Dust explosions can occur where any dispersed powdered combustible material is present in high-enough concentrations in the atmosphere or other oxidizing gaseous medium, such as pure oxygen. Dust explosions are a frequent hazard in coal mines, grain elevators, and other industrial environments. The Port Colborne explosion was just one of five that occurred in North America between May 20 to September 13, 1919, due to a lack of regulations concerning grain shipment. The series of dust explosions resulted in 70 deaths and many more injuries.

Explosion

See also

Bibliography 
Notes

References 

 

1919 disasters in Canada
1919 industrial disasters
1919 in Canada
Disasters in Ontario
Dust explosions
Explosions in 1919
Food processing disasters
Industrial fires and explosions in Canada
Port Colborne